Seawing may refer to:

J & J Ultralights Seawing, an amphibious ultralight aircraft
Seawing, a Transformers comics character
Sea Wing, an excursion vessel on Lake Pepin, Minnesota, in the Sea Wing disaster of 1890
Seawing,  a cruise ship formerly 
Seawings, an seaplane operator in Dubai, UAE
 Seawing Airways, a seaplane operator at Rose Bay Water Airport, Sydney, Australia
 SeaWings, a fictional tribe in the Wings of Fire novel series